Isaac Asimov's Robot City: Cyborg is a 1987 novel by William F. Wu. It is part of the series Isaac Asimov's Robot City, which are inspired by Isaac Asimov's Robot series, and his Foundation novels.

Plot summary 
Derec and Ariel are stranded on a mystery planet in an experimental city entirely populated by robots. Because Robot City has no spaceport, space ships or any way to radio for help, their only hope is to find the Key of Perihelion, an advanced transporting device that brought them to Robot City, and use it to transport elsewhere.  While searching the city for clues, they learn the robots have taken the Key to a large building, but they cannot gain access into the building.
Ariel distracts the security robot while Derec sneaks in to and learns the robots have dismantled the original Key in order produce more. Derec is caught trying to steal one of the newly manufactured Keys and is taken to the supervisor robot. However, he was still able to hide one on his person. They learn a Key only works with the being (robot, human, or alien) who has initialized it and the robots are initializing all the Keys for robots.

In searching the Central Core for other options of self-rescue, they discover there are now three other unknown beings on the planet. Through interviewing random robots near sightings, they determine two of the three are a robot and a child, who is most likely starving due to the absence of food in an all robot city.  They begin using their food replicator to produce food smells in hopes to attract the hungry visitor. It also involves a First Law priority to get the robots to help them search for the other inhabitants.

The third being is Jeff, a human who is the only survivor of a passenger ship that was attempting an emergency landing on the planet. Robot City's medical robots, who have advanced medical knowledge but erroneously lack basic human anatomy knowledge, weren't able to save Jeff's body. First Law dictated they save his brain by transplanting it into a robot body, thus creating a cyborg. They then froze his body to repair it when they get the human anatomy data they need.

When Jeff wakes up and is made aware of this fact, he panics and escapes without the medical team being able to finish their tests. Jeff quickly begins displaying psychological problems such as paranoia and anger impulses. He determines he is going to take over and rule Robot City with his superior strength, due to his robot body, yet no obligation to follow the Three Laws of Robotics. The medical team organizes a citywide search for Jeff, but his outward appearance makes it easy for him to blend anonymously into the robot crowd.

While exploring the city, Jeff's robot nose smells Derec and Ariel's food and follows the smells to them. In a fit of paranoid rage, he strikes them. Other robots, unaware of the robot being a "human," see this attack as a malfunctioning robot breaking the First Law and attempt to seize him, but Jeff escapes. Derec and Ariel are then involved in the capture of Jeff for their safety. They fear Jeff is in danger due to a chemical imbalance his brains life support system which increases the city's robots priority in searching for Jeff.

Later, Jeff happens across the other pair of beings in the city - Alpha and Wolruf. As Derec and Ariel surmised, Wolruf is starving. Jeff takes sympathy on the non-human and orders a city robot to feed Wolruf, but to not to report it is doing so. Also, Jeff calls Derec and Ariel and attempts to convince Ariel that she and Derec should do the transplant as well. This strikes a chord with Ariel due to her fatal disease. Jeff escapes detection several other times, but the medical team's search net is closing in.

Jeff is finally caught and identified by his lack of a radio comlink and his failure to accurately reproduce the behavior of a robot following the Three Laws. It is confirmed a hormone imbalance due to the robot's naivety of human chemistry has caused his erratic behavior. By scanning Derec's body, the medical robots are able to repair Jeff's human body and re-transplant his brain back into it.

Because of Alpha's lack of a radio comlink, he was also singled out during the search for Jeff. This brings Alpha back in contact with Derec and Ariel, who then learn of Wolruf's presence on the planet as well. Alpha also informs Derec that during Jeff's capture, he has been renamed to Mandelbrot when his special arm, which came from a robot similar to those in Robot City, became fully functional. Alpha, now Mandelbrot, informs them that the two arrived in a small ship taken from the Rockliffe Space Station and used it to follow the radio signal left by the Key.  Thus, there is a working ship they can use to escape.

They are disappointed to find the ship is a one-person escape pod.  They decide Jeff is the one who should use it to leave once his body has recuperated, despite Ariel's impending mortality. By now Derec and Ariel infer they have feelings for each other, but do not discuss it. Jeff leaves Robot City promising to send a rescue team when he reaches civilization.  Again, Derec and Ariel are stranded in Robot City.

External links 
 Isaac Asimov's Robot-Empire-Foundation Series Timeline
 

1987 novels
1987 science fiction novels
Cyborgs in literature
Novels about robots